Michèle Ray-Gavras (born 1939) is a French film producer and journalist.

Reporter 
As an independent journalist between 1963 and 1977, Michèle Ray covered struggles in Vietnam and Bolivia for multiple French media.

Between April 1966 and February 1967, while reporting on the Vietnam war, Michèle Ray travelled in South Vietnam among the American GI forces. She then continued to the communist north and was captured by the Vietcong on 17 January 1967. She was liberated on 6 February after falling sick. She brought back a special report published in the Nouvel Observateur, a film that was used in the documentary Far from Vietnam, and she published a book, The Two Shores of Hell.

She traveled to Bolivia in 1967 to report on the capture and death of Che Guevara, publishing an article in Paris Match before being expelled from the country.
In 1971, Michèle Ray was covering the Uruguayan general election for French television and radio, when she was kidnapped by the anarchist group OPR-33 and held for 3 days, between 29 November and 3 December before being released. Costa Gavras was in Uruguay at the time, preparing his film State of Siege.

Producer 

 1978 : The Recourse to the Method (El recurso del método) by Miguel Littín
 1983 : Hanna K. by Costa-Gavras
 1985 : Le Thé au harem d'Archimède by Mehdi Charef
 1986 : Conseil de famille by Costa-Gavras
 1987 : Miss Mona by Mehdi Charef
 1988 : Camomille by Mehdi Charef
 1993 : Latcho Drom by Tony Gatlif
 1993 : La Petite Apocalypse by Costa-Gavras
 1994 : En attendant les barbares (ou Loin des barbares) by Liria Bégéja
 1996 : Pereira prétend (Sostiene Pereira) by Roberto Faenza
 1996 : Mondo by Tony Gatlif
 1996 : Rainbow pour Rimbaud by Jean Teulé
 2002 : Le Corsaire, le magicien, le voleur et les enfants (documentaire) by Julie Gavras
 2002 : Amen. by Costa-Gavras
 2005 : Le Couperet by Costa-Gavras
 2006 : Mon colonel by Laurent Herbiet
 2007 : Cartouches gauloises by Mehdi Charef
 2012 : Avant que de tout perdre by Xavier Legrand
 2015 : Maintenant ils peuvent venir by Salem Brahimi
 2015 : Graziella by Mehdi Charef
 2017 : À mon âge je me cache encore pour fumer by Rayhana (Obermeyer)
 2019 : Adults in the Room by Costa-Gavras

She is currently working on a remake of Le Couperet with Park Chan-wook.

Personal life 
Ray married Costa Gavras in 1968, on the set of Z. They have 3 children, Alexandre Gavras, Julie Gavras, and Romain Gavras. She is also the mother of Patrick Maffone, from an earlier union.

References

External links 
 
 

1939 births
French film producers
Living people